The 1983 World Table Tennis Championships mixed doubles was the 37th edition of the mixed doubles championship.  

Guo Yuehua and Ni Xialian defeated Chen Xinhua and Tong Ling in the final by three sets to two.

Results

See also
List of World Table Tennis Championships medalists

References

-